A Limia is a comarca in the Galician Province of Ourense. The overall population of this local region is 20,075 (2019).

Municipalities
Baltar, Os Blancos, Calvos de Randín, Porqueira, Rairiz de Veiga, Sandiás, Sarreaus, Trasmiras, Vilar de Barrio, Vilar de Santos and Xinzo de Limia.

References

A Limia